Albrighton is a civil parish in Shropshire, England.  It contains 36 listed buildings that are recorded in the National Heritage List for England.  Of these, two are listed at Grade II*, the middle of the three grades, and the others are at Grade II, the lowest grade.  The parish contains the large village of Albrighton, the smaller village of Cosford, and the surrounding countryside.  Most of the listed buildings consist of houses in the villages, and farmhouses and farm buildings in the surrounding countryside.  The other listed buildings include a church and structures in the churchyard, public houses, a railway station and bridges, a water pumping station, and a war memorial.

Key

Buildings

References

Citations

Sources

Lists of buildings and structures in Shropshire